Jacopo Gasparini (March 23, 1879 – May 16, 1941) was an Italian Governor of Eritrea. He was a recipient of the Order of Saints Maurice and Lazarus. He was an officer of the Legion of Honour.

External links
Ulteriori informazioni nella scheda sul database dell'Archivio Storico del Senato, I Senatori d'Italia.

 

1879 births
1941 deaths
Recipients of the Order of Saints Maurice and Lazarus
Officiers of the Légion d'honneur
Italian Governors of Eritrea